Penestola is a genus of moths of the family Crambidae. The genus was described by Heinrich Benno Möschler in 1890.

Species
Penestola bufalis (Guenée, 1854)
Penestola simplicialis (Barnes & McDunnough, 1913)
Penestola stercoralis (Möschler, 1881)

References

Spilomelinae
Crambidae genera
Taxa named by Heinrich Benno Möschler